Chris St. Clair is a former Italy international rugby league footballer who played in the 1990s. He played for Balmain in the ARL/NRL competition.

Playing career
St. Clair made his first grade debut for Balmain in round 13 of the 1997 ARL season against Illawarra at WIN Stadium. He played off the bench in Balmain's 18-6 victory. St. Clair was limited to only three appearances for the club in 1997. In the 1998 NRL season, St. Clair made four appearances throughout the year. In the same year, St. Clair played one representative match for Italy against Lebanon at Leichhardt Oval and later played in game 3 of the 1999 Mediterranean Cup against France. After departing Balmain, St. Clair played for St Gaudens Bears in the French Elite One division and for York in England.

References

1976 births
Balmain Tigers players
Italy national rugby league team players
Australian rugby league players
Rugby league hookers
Rugby league second-rows
Living people